Rico Rene Granados Blanco (born March 17, 1973) is a Filipino singer, songwriter, multi-instrumentalist, record producer, actor, endorser and entrepreneur. He began his career as one of the founding members, and served as the chief songwriter, vocalist, guitarist, and keyboardist of the Filipino rock band Rivermaya from 1994 until 2007, and has been a solo artist since 2008.

Blanco's songs and performances gained success and critical acclaim, earning himself a reputation of being one of the well received local music icons in the Philippines.

Early life
Rico Blanco was born at Manila Doctors Hospital in Ermita, Manila on March 17, 1973, to Rene Aldeguer Blanco of Iloilo City and Purita Crisostomo Granados of Leyte, Leyte. Blanco grew up in San Pedro, Laguna. Blanco graduated grade school at O. B. Montessori Center, high school at the Benedictine Abbey (now called San Beda College Alabang) and college at the Ateneo de Manila University with a degree of AB Management Economics where he was once a classmate of Kris Aquino. Rico was an A-student and was accelerated twice in grade school.  He was once a Sangguniang Kabataan chairman.

Early career
Rico was one of the founding members of the Filipino rock band Rivermaya, in varying roles as vocalist, keyboardist, guitarist, and main songwriter from 1994 to 2007.

Rico Blanco is also a stage, film, and television actor. He starred in ABS-CBN's Imortal alongside John Lloyd Cruz and Angel Locsin, and May Isang Pangarap alongside Carmina Villaroel and Vina Morales. He also starred alongside Noel Cabangon and Joey Ayala in the Music Museum and 1970s Bistro production of Jesus Christ Superstar and also starred alongside Epy Quizon and Christopher de Leon in the independent film Nasaan si Francis?. He also directed several music videos, won an award for his work as advertising musical arranger. Blanco also dabbles in painting and photography.

Among the albums Blanco produced are Slapshock's Project 11–41, Sugarfree's Sa Wakas, The Dawn's Salamat (Millennium edition single), Teeth's I Was a Teenage Tree and Rivermaya's Free album which won him an NU Rock award for Producer of the year. Blanco also used to host MYX Live. He also composed and arranged scores for many commercials & other various corporate functions around the Philippines.

In May 2007, Blanco announced his departure from Rivermaya. His last performance with Rivermaya was on May 4, 2007, at the Metro Bar (wherein two other high-profile Filipino bands opened the show, Pupil and Sandwich; two spin-off bands of the legendary pop-rock group Eraserheads). It was coincidental that Rico's first gig as singer for Rivermaya was also held at the Metro Bar (formerly known as "Kampo"). Furthermore, first ever Rivermaya gig (where Blanco was keyboardist) was in Las Piñas in 1993 where the band was the opening act for Eraserheads.

In 2007, he launched a clothing line for a clothing brand in the Philippines, Human. Blanco also wrote and produced an electronic dance music song titled "Control" for the album of Nancy Castiglione. In the same year, Rico Blanco was also cast as the voice actor of Ryusuke Minami, lead guitarist of the fictional band, Beck, in the Filipino dubbed edition of the anime series BECK: Mongolian Chop Squad.

Solo career

Your Universe (2008-2011)
On June 12, 2008, Warner Music Philippines, launched Rico Blanco's first single "Yugto" which marked his entry in the Filipino music industry as a solo artist. Critics and music fans immediately hail it as a "neo-epic".  The song won a host of awards, among them 4 major Awit awards including Song of the Year. His first album titled Your Universe was released on August 8, 2008. The 10-track CD is a unique fusion of diverse sounds, among them the ethno-rock "Yugto", the heart-tugging title track "Your Universe", the rockabilly/punk feel of "Ayuz", the sweet, Pinoy-folk "Para Hindi Ka Mawala", and the sing-along anthem "Antukin". Also notable is his return to his roots as a keyboard player as evidenced by the infusion of synthesizer and electronic elements throughout the album. Incidentally, Warner Music Philippines are known for disbanding bands and turning their respective lead vocalists into solo artists.

Rico's live band was usually composed of Robert de la Cruz (of Queso and Skychurch) on drums and Ricci Gurango (formerly of Hungry Young Poets and Mojofly) on bass, while Rico plays guitars and keyboards. Many other session musicians join him on stage from time to time.

In November 2008, Blanco won the "Vocalist of the Year" award in the NU Rock Awards. In December 2008, he was heralded RX93.1 "OPM Solo Artist of the Year". He also opened for Myx Mo 2008 and performed "Yugto". Aside from his band, The Mandaluyong Children's Choir, Manila Symphony Orchestra, Kulintangan musicians (headed by Malou Matute), and various Percussionists (headed by Iggy de Dios), all performed with him. The opening set was touted to be the biggest in the event's history.

In February 2009, he won as "Best New Artist" in the MYX Music Awards 2009. Then, Blanco was picked by Unilever Philippines to re-write and sing a version of the regional campaign song of Close Up toothpaste, released a single entitled "Come Closer".

In December 2009, Blanco launched his new music video for the single "Ayuz", it features his dance tribute to Gene Kelly and Fred Astaire, with Cristine Reyes as special guest.

In May 2010, Blanco was announced to be on the cast of ABS-CBN's supernatural-political thriller TV series Imortal which stars John Lloyd Cruz and Angel Locsin, Blanco also sang the song "Kahit Walang Sabihin" for the said TV series. This was followed by the launch of Rico Blanco's very own company, Balcony Entertainment, in cooperation with Warner Music Philippines.

The same year, Rico Blanco launched his first album "Your Universe" in other Asian countries such as Singapore and Hong Kong. The Asian release featured a new single "Neon Lights", the song quickly gained the number 1 spot in Hong Kong charts beating other artists such as Justin Bieber, Avril Lavigne, Wonder Girls and Mika.

In June 10, 2010, Rico Blanco Collaborated with PLDT-SME with the title "Bossing Ako" with Arnel Pineda. and was launched in NBC Tent at the Fort, Taguig City to serves as an anthem for entrepreneurs and would-be entrepreneurs.

In the same year, Blanco co-wrote the song "Chemistry" with Solenn Heussaff for the latter's self-titled debut album.

Galactik Fiestamatik
In 2012, Blanco released a new single, Amats, available for digital download via iTunes.  The single was taken from his second studio album Galactik Fiestamatik released on July 10, 2012.

Dating Gawi
On October 6, 2015, Rico Blanco signs with Universal Records. and will release his album in a November release and fellow musicians Roll Martinez, Buddy Zabala & Raimund Marasigan will help Rico work on his new album.

On November 11, 2015, Rico released a Lyric Video on his new carry single "Videoke Queen". On November 27, 2015, Blanco released his third album Dating Gawi.
His single "Wag Mong Aminin" was the number 1 song for 2016 in Magic 89.9's OPM chart.

Rivermaya semi reunion
On January 9, 2016, he re-united with his former Rivermaya co-members, Perf de Castro, Nathan Azarcon and Mark Escueta for a "secret mini semi-reunion", following de Castro's gig at 19 East, Taguig City.

Present status
On July 3, 2019 Rico collaborated with IV of Spades with the song "Nagbabalik" and a Music Video was released in July 15, 2019

On July 28, 2019, his solo debut "Your Universe" was released in Vinyl Format

In May 1, 2020. Rico released his new song "This Too Shall Pass". As a message to bring comfort to those who needing light and love amid the Covid 19 pandemic. And a music video was released on May 17, 2020

On August 25, 2020 Rico released "Happy Feeling". And a Music Video was released on December 11, 2020

On May 27, 2021, Imperial Blue Whisky release a commercial with Rico Blanco singing the song "Alaala" as a tribute to summer's past.
On June 15, 2021. He posted a music video of the song "Alaala"(which was shot 6 years ago) on his YouTube channel.

On August 23, 2021. Rico Blanco will be producing the late Jamir Garcia posthumously solo debut album. And release the single "Paraiso" on September 5, 2021

In September 14, 2021, Rico released his newest single, a new cover version of "Pinoy Ako" entitled "Pinoy Tayo" for Pinoy Big Brother: Kumunity Season 10, the 10th season of the Philippine reality show Pinoy Big Brother.  And a music Video was released in February 7, 2022

Charity and social activism
Blanco was a founding Sangguniang Kabataan chairman in his hometown of San Pedro, Laguna long before he started his music career.

Aside from his songwriter credits in his solo album and in Rivermaya, Blanco also arranged and wrote music for various cause oriented projects such as the United Nations Millennium Development Goals theme "Tayo Tayo Rin", The Philippine Department of Tourism theme "Biyahe Tayo", both of which were performed by veteran Filipino musicians, such as Freddie Aguilar, the APO Hiking Society, Lea Salonga, and Sharon Cuneta. He also co-wrote "Posible", which has been used as a theme song for the 2005 Southeast Asian Games.

During his hiatus from music in 2007, Blanco spent his time with philanthropic work. In late 2007 he came out of retirement to sing for the Sumilao farmers who walked 1,700 km from Bukidnon to reach Department of Agrarian Reform in Metro Manila.

Rico sang together with Imago vocalist Aia de Leon, and Sandwich frontman Raimund Marasigan, on "Ako ang Simula", the theme song for a campaign which calls on Filipinos, especially the youth, to actively participate in the 2010 elections.

When super typhoons ravaged the Philippines in September 2009, Rico responded quickly by writing and recording and releasing "Bangon", to raise awareness and ultimately, funds to help the victims of the typhoons. Rico gave away the song as a free download to give hope to the victims, salute the heroes and inspire people to continue helping. Blanco also said that he is waiving all royalties due to him for the mobile downloads of the song, which he will instead give to affected families.

In March 2011, Sesame Street Philippines went into partnership with Blanco to launch the new education campaign called Sesame Street "Kid Ako". The campaign will launch in schools which will use Sesame Street books and videos to help encourage learning among kids at an early age. Blanco is also set to make two songs for the campaign.

When typhoon Haiyan devastated his mother's home province, Blanco decided to spend the New Year holidays in a still-reeling and electricity-less Leyte and perform in as many evacuation centers as possible to comfort the survivors and help educate them about the importance of hygiene in preventing the spread of post-calamity diseases. A few weeks prior, just after the typhoon struck, Blanco nearly cancelled his appearance at the Sundown Music Festival in Singapore, but decided to forge on and dedicated his performance and talent fees to the people of Leyte.

In 2014, he released a single "Ito ang Ating Sandali" which become The ABS-CBN Sports+Action’s station ID.

He currently serves as the president of the Filipino Society of Composers Authors and Publishers (FILSCAP). A non-profit, non-government, collective management organization that champions intellectual property rights.

Personal life
Blanco is currently in a relationship with actress and singer-songwriter Maris Racal since March 24, 2019.

Musical influences
At a young age, Rico listened heavily to his uncle's records which included The Beatles, jazz and 1970s rock. He moved on to appreciate late 1970s to 1980s punk rock, post punk, synth pop and new wave artists (mostly from the U.K.) such as XTC, The Cure, The Smiths, U2, Echo & the Bunnymen, The Sex Pistols, The Clash, Depeche Mode, Kraftwerk, OMD, Tears for Fears, Ultravox, New Order, Madness, Terry Hall, Siouxsie & the Banshees, Midnight Oil (Aus), among others. He also listened to Filipino artists such as Deans December, Violent Playground, Identity Crisis, Urban Bandits, Joey Ayala, among others. The music he listened to while growing up is largely credited for his musical style.

Endorsements and business interests
Throughout his career, Rico Blanco has partnered with some of the biggest brands in the Philippines for their advertising campaigns.

Blanco was a partner in Capone's Makati, and Alphonse Bistro/Vault in Pasig. He is currently a partner in Time in Manila in Makati and The Brewery at the Palace in Taguig.

In 2010, Rico Blanco established Loudbox, an audio production/post studio mainly catering to the Advertising industry. His business partners are Manuel Legarda of Wolfgang, Sach Castillo, Allan Feliciano, and Edsel Tolentino.

Also on the same year, following his endorsement in Human clothing brand, Rico launched his own brand named Koboi, located at San Juan City, Metro Manila.

In 2014, he released a single "Ito ang Ating Sandali" which become The ABS-CBN Sports+Action’s station ID.

In 2014, Rico Blanco was introduced as the newest brand ambassador of Giordano Philippines. also on the same year he teams up with Valde Pastilles and released a song "Time For You" which used as the song on TV commercial.

Filmography

Television

Movies

Music Video director

Discography (as solo artist)

Albums

Singles

Awards (as individual/solo artist)

References

1973 births
Ateneo de Manila University alumni
21st-century Filipino male singers
Filipino songwriters
Rock songwriters
Filipino rock musicians
VJs (media personalities)
Living people
People from Laguna (province)
People from Ermita
Musicians from Manila
Filipino multi-instrumentalists
Rivermaya members
Visayan people
20th-century Filipino male singers
Viva Records (Philippines) artists
Viva Artists Agency
Sony Music Philippines artists